DeBolt is a hamlet in northern Alberta, Canada within the Municipal District of Greenview No. 16.  A variant name is Debolt. H. E. Debolt, an early postmaster, gave the community his last name.

The hamlet is located in census division No. 18.

Geography 

Demographics 

Economy 

The economy is based on agriculture, ranching and oil and gas. Forestry, logging and plywood production are other elements of the economy. Star Industries, Star Fabrication, DeBolt Contracting, P&G Kitchens, and Moore Seed are some of the main employers of the area.

Attractions 
The Hubert Memorial Park, a collection of early buildings and artifacts, is located in DeBolt, while Legion Hall is part of the DeBolt and District Pioneer Museum.

Infrastructure 
DeBolt also has a fire hall for volunteer firefighters.

Services 
The community has a church, a pub, a general store with restaurant and a gas station.

Notable residents 
Ken Belford, a poet 
Roy Bickell, a fossil hunter, philanthropist and local historian

See also 

List of communities in Alberta
List of designated places in Alberta
List of hamlets in Alberta

References 

Municipal District of Greenview No. 16
Hamlets in Alberta
Designated places in Alberta